Benedikt Anton Aufschnaiter (baptised 21 February 1665, Kitzbühel – buried 24 January 1742, Passau) was an Austrian Baroque composer.

Aufschnaiter received much of his musical education in Vienna, where he lived for several years. Later he got a post at the band near to the emperor's court. On 16 January 1705, he was appointed Kapellmeister at the Passau court by Bishop-Cardinal Johann Philipp von Lamberg as a successor to Georg Muffat. Aufschnaiter died there in January 1742.

He was married twice and from the second marriage, he had a son.

Most of Aufschnaiter's 300 surviving works are sacred. In his Regulæ Fundamentales Musurgiæ, he named Giacomo Carissimi, Orlande de Lassus, Johann Kaspar Kerll and Adam Gumpelzhaimer as his idols.

List of selected works

Theoretical works
Regulæ Fundamentales Musurgiæ (Fundamental rules on composing good music)

Compositions
Concors discordia op. 2 (Nürnberg 1695) – six serenades for orchestra 
Dulcis Fidium Harmoniæ op. 4 (Augsburg 1703) – eight string sonatas
Memnon sacer ab oriente op. 5 (Augsburg 1709) – Vesper psalms
Alaudæ V op. 6 (1711) – five masses
Aquila clangens op. 7 (Passau 1719) – twelve offertories
Cymbalum Davidis op. 8 (Passau 1728) – four Vesper psalms
Miserere pro tempore quadragesimae op. 9 (unpublished, 1724)
Concerto o parthia della cortesia
Kommt, beschaut die Weisoheit – Pastorella-Trio sonata
Litaniae Lauretanae
Requiem in C major (1738)
Serenada della pace in C major
Sonata gloriosa

References
For references see the references in the article on German Wikipedia.

External links

Sound-bites from Concors discordia op. 2
Discography 

1665 births
1742 deaths
People from Kitzbühel
Austrian classical composers
Austrian Baroque composers
18th-century classical composers
18th-century Austrian male musicians
Austrian male classical composers